The Speak Now World Tour was the second concert tour by American singer-songwriter Taylor Swift, and it was launched in support of her third studio album Speak Now (2010). The Speak Now tour began on February 9, 2011 in Singapore and the tour ended on March 18, 2012 in Auckland, New Zealand.

The tour received positive reception from critics, lauding the visuals as well as Swift's connection with her audience and stage performance. It was ranked 10th in Pollstar's "Top 50 Worldwide Tour (Mid-Year)", earning over $40 million. At the conclusion of 2011, the tour was placed fourth on Pollstar's annual "Top 25 Worldwide Tours", earning $104.2 million with 100 shows. This made it the highest-grossing female and solo tour of 2011.

Multiple dates across the North American leg were recorded and released for a concert film and live album—both entitled Speak Now World Tour – Live—on November 21, 2011.

Background and development

I’m so excited to go back out on tour again in 2011! The 'Fearless Tour' was so much fun and even more unforgettable than I ever imagined, and I can't wait to get back out and play my new music from Speak Now! The fans have been so amazing and I'm thrilled to play in new cities around the world and meet even more of my fans in 2011!

While promoting Speak Now, Swift mentioned her excitement for her upcoming tour. She stated that the tour was going to be "big" and "extensive". On November 23, 2010, various media outlets—including Billboard magazine announced the second tour by Swift. It follows her successful Fearless Tour which played for over 100 dates in over five countries. The tour marked the singer's first tour to perform in stadiums. Before the tour commenced, Swift performed "The Allure of Taylor Swift" aboard the MV Allure of the Seas at the Allure of the Seas Aquatheater, as a part of Royal Caribbean Cruises on January 21, 2011 in Cozumel, Mexico. Swift used Tom Petty's "American Girl" as her entrance song.

Arm lyrics

During the North American and Australasian tour legs, Swift wrote different song lyrics, and occasionally quotes from famous speeches and movies, on her left arm for each performance. She has said that the lyrics should be viewed as a nightly "mood ring" and The New Yorker has cited the practice as an example of Swift's "keen understanding of what fuels fan obsession in the first place: a desire for intimacy between singer and listener".

Acoustic cover versions
Swift performed many acoustic cover versions during her North American tour. In each city, she paid tribute to a homegrown artist. She has said the cover versions allowed her to be "spontaneous" in an otherwise well-rehearsed show: "You'll have a lot of people who will come to more than one show, and I want them to get a different experience every time."

Set list
The following set list is from the May 27, 2011 show in Omaha, Nebraska. It is not intended to represent all dates throughout the tour.

 "Sparks Fly"
 "Mine"
 "The Story of Us"
 "Our Song"
 "Mean"
 "Back to December" (contains elements of "Apologize" and "You're Not Sorry")
 "Better than Revenge"
 "Speak Now"
 "Fearless" (contains elements of "Hey, Soul Sister" and "I'm Yours")
 "Last Kiss"
 "You Belong with Me"
 "Dear John"
 "Enchanted"
 "Haunted"
 "Long Live"

Encore

Tour dates

Notes

References

External links

Taylor Swift concert tours
2011 concert tours
2012 concert tours
Concert tours of Asia
Concert tours of Europe
Concert tours of North America
Concert tours of Oceania
Concert tours of Singapore
Concert tours of South Korea
Concert tours of Japan
Concert tours of the Philippines
Concert tours of Hong Kong
Concert tours of Belgium
Concert tours of the Netherlands
Concert tours of Norway
Concert tours of Germany
Concert tours of Italy
Concert tours of France
Concert tours of Spain
Concert tours of the United Kingdom
Concert tours of Ireland
Concert tours of the United States
Concert tours of Canada
Concert tours of Australia
Concert tours of New Zealand